Mitch Ostlie is an American politician and insurance salesman serving as a member of the North Dakota House of Representatives from the 12th district. He was appointed to the position on February 18, 2020.

Education 
Ostile earned a Bachelor of Science degree in education from Mayville State University.

Career 
Ostile is the owner of an insurance company. He has also served on the Jamestown, North Dakota School Board and Jamestown Planning and Zoning Committee. He was selected to serve as a member of the North Dakota House of Representatives by the District 12 Republican Executive Committee, succeeding Jim Grueneich.

References 

Living people
Mayville State University alumni
Republican Party members of the North Dakota House of Representatives
People from Jamestown, North Dakota
People from Stutsman County, North Dakota
Year of birth missing (living people)